E120 most often refers to:
 Carmine, a food colourant with the E number E120
 Unbinilium, also known as element 120 or eka-radium, a predicted chemical element not yet observed

It may also refer to: 
 E120 bomblet, a U.S. Cold War biological cluster bomb sub-munition
 The ICAO aircraft type designator for the Embraer EMB 120 Brasilia
 Juniper E-Series, Broadband Services Router
 KiHa E120, a Japanese train type
 Toyota Corolla (E120), a car
 Acer beTouch E120, a smartphone

See also
 Azorubine (E122)